Chemudu is a village in Makkuva mandal in Parvathipuram Manyam district of Andhra Pradesh, India.

Geography
Chemudu is located at 18.6333N 83.2167E. It has an average elevation of 151 meters (498 feet).

Demographics
According to Indian census, 2001, the demographic details of this village is as follows:
 Total Population: 	1,833 in 411 Households.
 Male Population: 	891
 Female Population: 	942
 Children Under 6-years of age: 256 (Boys - 122 and Girls -	134)
 Total Literates: 	780

References

Villages in Parvathipuram Manyam district